Wallace John "Doc" Elliott (April 6, 1900 - January 11, 1976) was an American football running back. He played five seasons in the National Football League for the Canton Bulldogs, Cleveland Bulldogs and the Cleveland Indians.  During that time he won NFL Championships with Canton in 1922 and 1923, as well as a third with the Cleveland Bulldogs in 1924. In 1926, the first American Football League was established. Elliott joined the AFL's Cleveland Panthers that year, however later in the season he signed with Philadelphia Quakers. For their one and only season in existence the Quakers won the AFL championship, before folding along with the league. After that season, Elliott retired from pro football, until 1931 when he played one season with the Cleveland Panthers. Elliott was described by the Green Bay Press-Gazette in 1924, after obtaining the newspaper's 1st team all-NFL honors as being “a first rate line plunger and wonder on the defense. Elliott was the equal of any when it came to backing up the line.”

References

Ongoing Research Project: Jersey Numbers
Encyclopedia of Cleveland History:Cleveland Panthers

Notes

1900 births
American football running backs
Players of American football from Youngstown, Ohio
Lafayette Leopards football players
Canton Bulldogs players
Cleveland Bulldogs players
Cleveland Indians (NFL 1931) players
Cleveland Panthers players
Philadelphia Quakers (AFL) players
1976 deaths